Matthew Thomas Gray Elliott (born 28 September 1971) is a former cricketer from Australia, who played as a left-handed opening batsman.

Beginnings with Victoria
After he made his debut for Victoria in the 1992–1993 season, he soon established himself as one of the top opening batsmen in Australian domestic cricket, before progressing his way through to the Bendigo and District Cricket Association playing for the Bendigo Cricket Club in his role as an opening batsman.

Test career
Elliott was called up to the Australian national team in the 1996–97 season, making his Test debut against the West Indies in November 1996.  Unfortunately for Elliott, in just his second Test match he was injured in a mid-pitch collision with teammate Mark Waugh, resulting in the need for knee surgery.

Elliott returned for the 1997 tour of South Africa. On the Ashes series in the same year in England and scored two centuries, including a career-best 199. He also made his One Day International debut in 1997 in the Texaco Cup, but scored 1, making it his only appearance in a limited overs international. Elliott was named one of the Wisden Cricketers of the Year for 1998, although this wasn't enough for him to hold down a regular spot, and due to inconsistent performances after the Ashes series, he slipped out of the national team in 1999. Steve Waugh, in his autobiography, described Elliott as "technically gifted but temperamentally flawed" and "prone to serious bouts of self-doubt and a tendency to let injuries rule his thought processes." He stated that "[Elliott] would have been a perfect candidate...[for] a sports psychologist."

He continued to perform at domestic level for Victoria and on the English county scene, and in the 2003–2004 season scored a remarkable 1381 runs in the Pura Cup, overtaking Graham Yallop's previous record (which was succeeded the very next year in 2004-05 by Michael Bevan).  Rewarded with the Pura Cup Player of the Year Award and a new Cricket Australia contract, he was recalled to the national team for the first time in 5 years, albeit for one unsuccessful Test against Sri Lanka where he batted at number 3 in place of Ricky Ponting who took time off due to a family bereavement. Batting outside his normal position, Elliott scored just 0 and 1.

This performance dented hopes of a resurgence in his international career greatly. In addition to this, he also had a below-par season in the subsequent 04/05 domestic season for Victoria, averaging in the mid-30s.

Move to South Australia

In April 2005 Elliott made a request to leave the Victorian team to join South Australia as player-coach; this was originally rejected by Cricket Victoria although Elliott appealed their decision.  On 5 May a Cricket Australia grievance tribunal overturned Cricket Victoria's decision, freeing the way for Elliott to join South Australia.

In the 2005–06 season Elliott struggled with injury and inconsistent form.

The 2006-07 Australian domestic season was equally disappointing, with just 193 runs at 13.8 from seven first class (Pura Cup) games. As a result, he was axed from the South Australian state side. Curiously his form in the domestic one-day competition was much better with 465 runs at 51.6, highlighted by two centuries.

English County Cricket

On the English county scene, Elliott made a century at Lord's in the 2002 C & G final to win the trophy for Yorkshire - their first one-day trophy for 15 years. He signed a short-term contract for the 2007 season with Yorkshire CCC. This was as cover for Yorkshire's primary overseas player Younis Khan, who was due to be participating in the 2007 Cricket World Cup. However, following Pakistan's untimely exit, Younis was able to take up his role at his new county from the start of the season, thus Elliott was left surplus to requirements. Following the cancellation, Elliott agreed to join Glamorgan on a four-week deal as cover for Australian left-handed batsmen Jimmy Maher.

Retirement
Elliott announced his retirement from first-class cricket in February 2008. He then played for the Chandigarh Lions in the ICL.

Notes

External links

HowSTAT! statistical profile on Matthew Elliott

1971 births
Living people
Australia One Day International cricketers
Australia Test cricketers
Glamorgan cricketers
South Australia cricketers
Victoria cricketers
Wisden Cricketers of the Year
Yorkshire cricketers
Kensington cricketers
Australian cricketers
Cricketers from Melbourne
ICL World XI cricketers
Chandigarh Lions cricketers
People from Chelsea, Victoria